The 2017–18 Armenian Cup was the 27th season of the football knockout competition in Armenia. The winners of the cup this season earned a place in the 2018–19 Europa League and would begin play in the first qualifying round. Shirak won the cup final in the previous season and were the defending champions.

The tournament began on 13 September 2017 with the quarter-final round, which was contested by the six Premier League clubs and two clubs from the First League.

Format
The Armenian Football Cup this season was contested over three rounds. The quarter-final and semi-final rounds were played over two legs, and the final was a single match to determine the cup winner.

Quarter–finals

Semi–finals

Final

Scorers

4 goals:
 Artur Yedigaryan - Alashkert

3 goals:

 Mihran Manasyan - Alashkert
 Gevorg Nranyan - Gandzasar Kapan
 Moussa Paul Bakayoko - Shirak

2 goals:

 Artak Dashyan - Alashkert
 Artak Yedigaryan - Alashkert
 Nenad Injac - Banants
 Lubambo Musonda - Gandzasar Kapan
 Petros Avetisyan - Pyunik

1 goals:

 Rafael Safaryan - Ararat Yerevan
 Grigor Aghekyan - Artsakh
 Rumyan Hovsepyan - Banants
 Ognjen Krasić - Banants
 Miljan Jablan - Alashkert
 Ara Khachatryan - Gandzasar Kapan
 Sargis Shahinyan - Gandzasar Kapan
 Alex Junior Christian - Gandzasar Kapan
 Artur Adamyan - Gandzasar Kapan
 Dmitri Yashin - Gandzasar Kapan
 Vardan Bakalyan - Shirak

See also
 2017–18 Armenian Premier League

References

Armenian Cup seasons
Armenian Cup
Cup